Teb o Tazkieh is a peer-reviewed open access quarterly medical & cultural publication that was established in 1992. The work "Teb o Tazkieh" in Persian language means "Medicine & Purification". The Teb o Tazkieh has a special part of Continuing Medical Education (CME) in each volume that is strictly interested and followed by readers. The Teb o Tazkieh is published by the deputy of research in Tehran University of Medical Sciences, affiliated with the Ministry of Health and Medical Education.

Journal's Focuses 
The Teb o Tazkieh has focuses on 2 goals by publishing the articles:

 Reflect the Ministry of Health and Medical Education’s policy on different issue especially on health care, education, students, culture.
 Reflect cultural ideas of the medical sciences society of Iran.

Abstracting and indexing 
The Teb o Tazkieh is indexed and abstracted in Scientific Information Database, Magiran, Iranmedex, Medlib and Irannamaye.

See also
Health care in Iran
Iranian South Medical Journal
Science and technology in Iran
Tehran University of Medical Sciences
Ministry of Health and Medical Education

References

External links 
 Official website

General medical journals